"You Make Me Feel Like Dancing" is a song credited to British singer Leo Sayer, taken from his 1976 album Endless Flight. It reached No. 1 on the U.S. Billboard Hot 100 chart, making it his first top single in the United States, and reached No. 2 on the UK Singles Chart. Billboard ranked it as the No. 13 song of 1977. Credited songwriters Sayer and Vini Poncia won a Grammy Award for the song in 1978 in the category Best R&B Song. Ray Parker Jr. has stated that he was the original song writer, and that when he gave the tune as a demo his accreditation as such was missed. Like other Sayer songs from that time, it features extensive use of the singer's falsetto voice, a very popular vocal register in the songs of the disco era.

Music video
In Australia, a live performance from the TV show Countdown is frequently used in place of a music video.

Personnel
Leo Sayer – vocals
John Barnes – clavinet
Larry Carlton, Ray Parker Jr. – guitar
Steve Gadd – drums
Clydie King, Becky Louis, Sherlie Matthews – background vocals
Chuck Rainey – bass
Gene Page – string arrangements

Chart performance

Weekly charts

Year-end charts

All-time charts

Cover versions
 A remixed version of "You Make Me Feel Like Dancing" credited to Groove Generation featuring Leo Sayer charted on the UK Singles Chart in 1998, peaking at No.32. 
 In 2008, the Wiggles sang the song as the title work of their DVD You Make Me Feel Like Dancing, with Leo Sayer guest starring.

References

1976 singles
1976 songs
Leo Sayer songs
Billboard Hot 100 number-one singles
Cashbox number-one singles
Number-one singles in New Zealand
RPM Top Singles number-one singles
Songs written by Vini Poncia
Songs written by Leo Sayer
Song recordings produced by Richard Perry
Chrysalis Records singles
Warner Records singles
Songs about dancing